Tempo was an artificial intelligence-enhanced calendar application for iOS. Developed by Tempo AI, a spinoff of SRI International, the application was reviewed by numerous blogs and media outlets, including Wired, VentureBeat, TechCrunch, and others. Raj Singh, Thierry Donneau-Golencer and Corey Hulen are the Co-Founders of Tempo AI, Inc.

Using data (from social media, calendars, emails, contacts, location, etc.) stored on a user's iPhone or iPod touch, Tempo compiled information related to any given event and displayed it when requested, hence making the application context-aware.

Information
The application was launched on February 13, 2013, and a reservation system was implemented on February 18, 2013, in order to handle high demand of over 100,000 signups. The day the reservation system was launched, nearly 73% of the ratings Tempo received in the App Store were one-star, the lowest possible. Previously, the application had received mainly five-star ratings.

On May 29, 2015, it was announced that Tempo had been acquired by Salesforce.com. The Tempo app was shut down on June 30, 2015.

References

Exyernal links
Hamraaz App
Hamraaz Army App

Calendaring software
IOS software
Salesforce